Peter Fricker may refer to:

 Peter Racine Fricker (1920–1990), English composer
 Peter Fricker (sports physician) (born 1950), Australian sports physician and administrator